Raghavan Varadarajan (born 27 November 1960) is an Indian biophysicist and a professor at the Indian Institute of Science. He is known for his researches in the fields of protein structure and protein folding and his contributions in developing vaccines and drugs for treating a type of fatal influenza and HIV-1. He is a former J. C. Bose National Fellow of the Department of Science and Technology and an elected fellow of the Indian Academy of Sciences and the Indian National Science Academy. The Council of Scientific and Industrial Research, the apex agency of the Government of India for scientific research, awarded him the Shanti Swarup Bhatnagar Prize for Science and Technology, one of the highest Indian science awards, in 2002, for his contributions to biological sciences.

Biography 
Born on 27 November 1960, Raghavan Varadarajan completed his graduate and master's degrees from the Indian Institute of Technology, Kanpur in 1982 and moved to the US for his doctoral studies at Stanford University under the guidance of Steven G. Boxer to secure a PhD. His post-doctoral studies were at Yale University at the laboratory of Frederic M. Richards during 1988–92 and he returned to India to start his academic career at the Indian Institute of Science (IISc) in 1992. Holding the position of a professor of Molecular Biophysics Unit, he heads The Varadarajan Laboratory of IISc which has research interests in the design of HIV-1 and influenza immunogens. He also serves as an honorary professor at Jawaharlal Nehru Centre for Advanced Scientific Research and as the chairman of the scientific board of Theramyt Novobiologics, a Bengaluru-based research platform (which he helped found), engaged in the development of biological drugs.

Legacy 
Varadarajan's early researches were focused on the interaction of protein molecules and their sequential properties. At Steven G. Boxer's laboratory, he worked on human myoglobin, a hemeprotein, and studied its dielectric properties as well as the redox potential/spectral properties of bound chromophores. Later, during his post-doctoral days at Yale, he researched on the structural and thermodynamic changes associated with cavity formation in proteins. Continuing his researches at IISc, he is known to have developed a new crystallographic and Nuclear magnetic resonance hydrogen exchange protocol for the characterization of disordered states of proteins and his studies helped in the estimation of the hydrophobic driving force in protein folding. Collaborating with Merck Research Laboratories on behalf of Jawaharlal Nehru Centre for Advanced Scientific Research, his team developed a number of immunogens which have been demonstrated to have positive effect as HIV-1 vaccines and he holds the patent for the invention. Merck have tested the a few vaccines and some of the other proposals are being tested by International AIDS Vaccine Initiative.

Varadarajan has published his research findings by way of several articles and his publications have been listed in a number of online article repositories. He served as an investigator of the DBT-IAVI Programme jointly organized by the Department of Biotechnology and International AIDS Vaccine Initiative for the development of HIV vaccines. He has also mentored a number of scholars in their doctoral researches and has conducted seminars on his researches.

Awards and honors 
Varadarajan received the B. M. Birla Science Award of the B. M. Birla Science Centre in 1998 for his contributions to the study of protein structure and foldings and the Council of Scientific and Industrial Research (CSIR) awarded him the Shanti Swarup Bhatnagar Prize, one of the highest Indian science awards in 2002. In 2013, CSIR honored him again with the G. N. Ramachandran Gold Medal for Excellence in Biological Sciences and Technology. He received a number of research fellowships which included the Swarnajayanthi Fellowship for Biological Sciences of the Department of Science and Technology and AIDS-Innovation Grant Award of the National Institutes of Health ( both in 1999), Senior Research Fellowship of Wellcome Trust (2000) and the J. C. Bose National Fellowship of the Department of Science and Technology (2007–12). He is also an elected fellow of the Indian National Science Academy and the Indian Academy of Sciences.

Selected bibliography

See also 

 Frederic M. Richards
 Immunogen
 Hemeprotein
 Myoglobin

Notes

References

External links 
 

Recipients of the Shanti Swarup Bhatnagar Award in Biological Science
1960 births
IIT Kanpur alumni
Stanford University alumni
Yale University alumni
Indian biophysicists
20th-century Indian inventors
Indian scientific authors
Living people
Fellows of the Indian National Science Academy
Fellows of the Indian Academy of Sciences
20th-century Indian biologists
21st-century Indian inventors